The 2015 SBS Drama Awards, presented by Seoul Broadcasting System (SBS), took place on December 31, 2015 at COEX Hall D in Samseong-dong, Seoul. It was hosted by Lee Hwi-jae, Lim Ji-yeon, and Yoo Jun-sang.

Winners and nominees
(Winners denoted in bold)

References

External links
 

SBS
SBS Drama Awards
SBS
December 2015 events in South Korea